Eucharis amazonica is a species of flowering plant in the family Amaryllidaceae, native to Peru. It is cultivated as an ornamental in many countries and naturalized in Venezuela, Mexico, the West Indies, Ascension Island, Sri Lanka, Fiji, the Solomon Islands and the Society Islands. The English name Amazon lily is used for this species, but is also used for the genus Eucharis as a whole (and for other genera).

The stamens are fused into a single cup.

In cultivation it is often confused with the hybrid Eucharis × grandiflora. As it is not hardy, it requires a sheltered spot with a protective winter mulch in colder areas. It has gained the Royal Horticultural Society's Award of Garden Merit.

References

amazonica
Flora of Peru
Garden plants
Plants described in 1857